Jabiru Airport  is an airport located  northwest of Ranger Uranium Mine and east of Jabiru in the Northern Territory of Australia. Situated within the Kakadu National Park it consists of one runway and five parking spaces for light aircraft such as Cessna 152s. Charter flight operators include AAA Charter, Kakadu Air and North Australian Helicopters.

See also
 List of airports in the Northern Territory

References

External links
 Crawford, Sarah (27 October 2011). "Pilot saves lives in plane crash drama." Ntnews.com.au, retrieved November 2011.

Airports in the Northern Territory